Yume No Hon: The Book of Dreams (2005) is a novel about a woman living as a hermit in ancient Japan written by Catherynne M. Valente.

Plot summary
After her village is destroyed, Ayako lives alone in the mountains.  Weaving through Ayako's life are her dreams; she explores the mythologies of goddesses from around the world and receives lessons from the river, mountain, and animals, who speak to her while the people from the village below dare only to leave offerings for her.

Allusions
Ayako's dreams touch upon a variety of literary, mythological, and religious subjects, ranging from the Greek Sphinx to Isis' recreation of Osiris' body.

References

External links
 Yume no Hon

2005 American novels
American fantasy novels
Novels by Catherynne M. Valente
Novels set in Japan
Japan in non-Japanese culture
Prime Books books